Mathieu Bouchard-Malo is a Canadian film editor from Quebec, who has received multiple Canadian Screen Award and Prix Iris nominations for his work on both narrative and documentary films.

Filmography

Nominations

References

External links

Canadian film editors
French Quebecers
Living people
Year of birth missing (living people)